The Malian Union for the African Democratic Rally (UM-RDA) is a political party in Mali led by Bocar Moussa Diarra.

History
The party was formed by a merger of the Sudanese Union – African Democratic Rally and the Bloc for Democracy and African Integration in August 2010, and officially registered on 26 Aug 2010. In the 2013 parliamentary elections it won a single seat.

References

Pan-Africanism in Mali
Pan-Africanist political parties in Africa
Political parties in Mali
Political parties established in 2010